Test Drive 4 is a racing game developed by Pitbull Syndicate and published by Accolade for PlayStation and Microsoft Windows in 1997. It offers 14 supercars and muscle cars, and tasks the player with beating computer opponents in tracks set in real life locales. The game's tracks are long courses with rural roads and urban streets, and commonly feature traffic and short corners. The player has to arrive at each checkpoint (a banner with text such as "Stage 1" or "Stage 2") before the Checkpoint Timer expires, resulting in additional time, and crossing the finish line is required to complete the race. Test Drive 4s commercial success briefly made Test Drive the best selling racing franchise, but the game received mixed reviews. In 1999 the game was republished under the Greatest Hits label after selling 850,000 copies within one year of its release.

Gameplay

Test Drive 4 offers 14 supercars and muscle cars, and tasks the player with beating computer opponents in tracks set in five real life locales: Keswick, Cumbria, San Francisco, Bern, Kyoto, and Washington, D.C.; the Windows version adds a sixth location: Munich. The game's tracks are long courses with rural roads and urban streets, and commonly feature traffic and short corners. The player has to arrive at each checkpoint (a banner with text such as "Stage 1" or "Stage 2") before the Checkpoint Timer expires, resulting in additional time, and crossing the finish line is required to complete the race. The police car can chase and stop a player who exceeds the speed limit; to counter this, the player either stops in front of the police car or outruns it. Only a few vehicles are available to the player from the outset, with the rest needing to be won or purchased as the game progresses.

In singleplayer, the player can participate in a Single Race, a Cup, or a Drag Race. The game also offers multiplayer; the Windows version of the game has three Network Options: serial, modem, and LAN, while the PlayStation version supports the PlayStation Link Cable.

Development and release

English video game developer Pitbull Syndicate was established in December 1996 by eight experienced programmers and  artists. In 1997, the studio designed Test Drive 4 in collaboration with publisher Accolade. According to Accolade president and CEO Jim Barnett, the game exploits 3D graphics to offer a satisfactory driving experience. Its fourteen vehicles were used under license from car designers such as Chrysler, the owner of the Dodge and Plymouth automobile brands. In contrast to multi-lap circuits found in most other racing games, Test Drive 4 only had linear point-to-point courses. The game's race tracks are realistically modeled after real places such as Kyoto, Japan and Washington, DC. The "jumps" in the San Francisco track were inspired by San Francisco Rush: Extreme Racing. Test Drive 4s techno-oriented soundtrack includes licensed songs from the bands Orbital and The Younger, Younger 28's; Accolade executive producer Chris Downend considered the two bands suitable for the game's energetic gameplay style.

Test Drive 4 was displayed at the 1997 Electronic Entertainment Expo (E3), and Accolade announced its November release date. Prior to its completion, the publisher spent $2 million dollars on a promotional campaign for the game; television commercials ran on ESPN, Speedvision, and MTV during the final two weeks of November, and radio advertisements appeared on The Howard Stern Show in December. Accolade vice president Stan Roach said that the company anticipated the game to be the highest-selling racing title of the winter season (and also its most successful product "in years"), and that the advertisements are the first time they signed promotional deals with broadcasting media since the beginning of the "16-bit market". Accolade published the game on 3 November for PlayStation, and 24 November for Microsoft Windows. The Windows release came in two versions, one with support for 3dfx video cards, and another with a software renderer. Electronic Arts imported its PlayStation version to Japan on 2 April 1998.

Reception

Sales
 the game sold over 850,000 copies. Because of its commercial success, the PlayStation version was republished under the Greatest Hits label. Accolade stated in a press release that the commercial successes of the game and the off-road-themed Test Drive: Off-Road caused Test Drive to become the top-selling racing series at the time.

Critical reviews

Reviews for Test Drive 4 were divergent, disagreeing on many aspects of the game, and ranged from mediocre to moderately positive. For example, reviewers for Electronic Gaming Monthly (EGM) and GameSpot both felt the inclusion of oncoming cars and police cars help liven up the action and were a distinctive feature of the Test Drive series, but Next Generation found them irritating and unfairly difficult to avoid due to the sensitive steering, and concluded that "had developer Pitbull done away with the hazards and just stuck to the driving, Test Drive 4 might have been a decent racer. As it stands, it's just another Need for Speed. And nobody needs that, not even EA." The sensitivity of the controls was cited as a problem by most critics, particularly when driving at high speed. IGNs Jaz Rignall added: "Also, the car's weight-shift response is not fluid, so there's no feeling of feedback -- once you lose control, it's very difficult to avoid spinning out." He said the controls are the one issue which made Test Drive 4 a good, rather than great game: "Had Test Drive 4 been more polished and better refined in the handling department, it would have been close to getting a 9. As it stands, it misses out on an 8 by a whisker."

Kelly Rickards and Kraig Kujawa of EGM and Glenn Rubenstein of GameSpot instead felt what held the game back was that its gameplay is simply too basic and generic to stand out, though Rickards still compared it positively to the Need for Speed series, calling it "the game Need for Speed II should have been." Rickards was among a number of critics who commented positively on the game's clash of modern cars with 1960s muscle cars, its diverse locales, and its drag strip. Rubenstein acknowledged that the drag strip is a unique feature in what he nonetheless maintained is an overall generic game.

The music was another subject of diverse opinions; GamePro called it "engaging and catchy", but Rignall and Rubenstein both deemed it unexciting and remarked that the use of techno music in racing games seemed to be played out. Where Rickards found the deranged, aggressive driving of the A.I. opponents to be annoying, Rignall argued that it presents an interesting and enjoyable challenge. The graphics, too, saw disagreement among critics; EGM and IGN both praised how the car models are highly detailed to the point where they are readily recognizable, while Next Generation contrarily stated that the detailing is poor and the in-race models are conspicuously less impressive than the ones on the car select screen. GamePro was the most impressed with Test Drive 4s graphics, summing up, "Easily one of the most highly detailed, graphically superior PlayStation racers to date, Test Drive 4 verges on perfection at every turn, but never quite takes the trophy." Test Drive 4 received "average" reviews on the PlayStation according to the review aggregation website GameRankings.

Sequel and legacy
Pitbull Syndicate developed a 1998 sequel, Test Drive 5; it features more vehicles and tracks and competed with Need for Speed III: Hot Pursuit. Accolade published Test Drive Off-Road 2 in 1998, which uses a modified version of the Test Drive 4 engine and includes licensed off-road vehicles.

References

External links

1997 video games
Accolade (company) games
Lake District in fiction
Multiplayer and single-player video games
Munich in fiction
PlayStation (console) games
Racing video games set in the United States
Sports video games set in Germany
Sports video games set in Japan
4
Video games developed in the United Kingdom
Video games set in Cumbria
Video games set in Kyoto
Video games set in San Francisco
Video games set in Switzerland
Video games set in Washington, D.C.
Windows games